Bergamasco may refer to:

 People 
 Arturo Bergamasco (born 1951), Italian rugby union footballer, father of Mauro and Mirco
 Eugenio Bergamasco (1858–1940), Italian engineer and politician
 Guglielmo Bergamasco (AKA Guglielmo dei Grigi, 14851550), Italian architect and sculptor
 Mauro Bergamasco (born 1979), Italian rugby union footballer, son of Arturo
 Mirco Bergamasco (born 1983), Italian rugby union footballer, son of Arturo
 Rafael Santos Bergamasco (AKA Rafael Akai, born 1986), Brazilian footballer
 Sonia Bergamasco (born 1966), Italian actress
 Caio Felipe Carneiro Bergamasco (born 1369), Hitman

 Places
 the region around the city of Bergamo, in the Italian region of Lombardy
 Bergamasco, Piedmont, a comune (municipality) in the province of Alessandria in the Italian region of Piedmont
 Caprino Bergamasco, a commune in the province of Bergamo in the Italian region of Lombardy
 Cisano Bergamasco, a commune in the province of Bergamo in the Italian region of Lombardy

 Other
Bergamasco Shepherd, a breed of dog with origins near Bergamo, Italy

 See also
 Bergamasque (disambiguation)
 Bergamo (disambiguation)
 

Surnames of Italian origin